Brookmere is an unincorporated community adjacent to Brook Creek in the Nicola region of southern British Columbia.

Name origin
Louis Henry Brooks and Phillip R. Brooks settled around 1909, naming the place as Brooksville. However, the general area was known as Otter Summit, deriving from Spearing Creek (formerly called the west arm of Otter Creek). The Kettle Valley Railway (KVR), a Canadian Pacific Railway (CP) subsidiary, called its station Otter Summit. 
The Vancouver, Victoria and Eastern Railway (VV& E), a Great Northern Railway subsidiary, renamed the station as Brookmere in October 1914, acknowledging one or both of the Brooks brothers. The KVR may not have officially changed the name until 1915, and an overlap in common usage occurred.

Railway
The KVR rail head from Merritt reached Otter Summit in September 1911, and trains operated the following year. In April 1913, the KVR and VV&E agreed to share the trackage to be laid between Hope and Princeton. The KVR would build eastward from Hope, and the VV&E westward from Princeton. In October 1914, Louis Hill drove the last spike five days after the two railways connected at Brookmere. The KVR passenger service through the stop began in May 1915.

In 1916, the KVR constructed a station, small workshop, and three-stall roundhouse. Assumedly, the water tank and  diameter turntable were built at this time. No evidence exists to indicate the VV&E built infrastructure at, or operated from, Brookmere. The KVR station, destroyed by fire in January 1917, was rebuilt by CP, but was available for joint use with GN. The replacement four-stall roundhouse, built in 1944, which was destroyed by a boiler explosion in 1947, was rebuilt.

Odlum (previously called Petain and west of Hope) to Brookmere was the Coquihalla Subdivision, and Brookmere to Penticton was the Princeton Subdivision. After the Coquihalla Subdivision remained unrepaired after the 1959 washouts, Princeton Subdivision became Spences Bridge to Penticton, and Brookmere ceased to be a divisional point. In 1966, Brookmere closed as a crew base. Passenger service ended in 1964.

By 1980, the former station building had been moved and became a private residence, but later burned down. CP ran the final freight train through Brookmere in 1989, and all track southeast of Spences Bridges was lifted by the end of summer 1991. Under threat of demolition, the two-spouted water tower was moved to its present location on an adjacent private property, where the pit of the former turntable still exists.

Early community
In 1915, the Betterton Fraser syndicate, owner of the Hastings Ranch, established the townsite of Brookmere on the property, erecting a sawmill to cut lumber for the construction of new buildings. E.J. Marshall was the inaugural postmaster 1916–1917. In 1916, C.R. Betterton, of Betterton Fraser, opened the Brookmere Hotel, with the general store likely being established around the same time. The store appears to have been housed inside the hotel during the early years. The hotel closed around 1935, the vacant building apparently consumed by fire a couple of years later. The general store, linked to Merritt by a substandard road, operated at least into the late 1950s, and possibly existed until the closure of the post office in 1969.

The estimated population was 25 in 1923, 125 in 1934, 169 in 1945, and 172 in 1948. In 1953, the replacement of steam locomotives with diesels, dramatically reduced the population. The arrival of workers to build the Trans Mountain pipeline brought new residents for a few years, before the construction contingent moved on and the houses were removed.

Later community
Prior to the opening of the Coquihalla Highway in 1986, Brookmere was quite remote. Nowadays, the village has a small permanent population, most residents being seasonal. The water supply comes from wells and a small dam on Brook Creek, but the water is not potable.

Recreation
The former railbed, which runs adjacent to the settlement, is a linear parkway forming part of the Trans Canada Trail.

The area is also popular with ATV and motorcycle enthusiasts in summer, and snowmobiles in winter. Coldwater Rd has been used several times as a transit section for the Mountain Trials Rally, headquartered in Merritt.

See also

References

Unincorporated settlements in British Columbia
Nicola Country
Populated places in the Thompson-Nicola Regional District